Ride, Tenderfoot, Ride is a 1940 American Western film directed by Frank McDonald and starring Gene Autry, Smiley Burnette, and June Storey. Written by Winston Miller, based on a story by Betty Burbridge and Connie Lee, the film is about a singing cowboy who inherits a meat-packing plant and must face stiff competition from a beautiful business rival.

Plot
Singing cowboy Gene Autry (Gene Autry) and his sidekick Frog Millhouse (Smiley Burnette) work on a ranch owned by Ann Randolph (June Storey). Gene is unaware that he has just inherited the Belmont Packing Company. While Gene and Frog take the cattle to market, Gene has an argument with Ann who fires them both, giving them one of the steers as back pay. Later the local sheriff, seeing a Randolph steer in the possession of the two cowboys, arrests Gene and Frog on suspicion of cattle rustling. Attorney Henry Walker (Forbes Murray), who has been searching for the singing cowboy, finally locates Gene at the jail and informs him of his inheritance.

After being released from jail, Gene takes possession of the Belmont Packing Company. Ann, who owns a rival packing company, had plans to merge the two companies under her ownership. Now she is dismayed to learn that the man she just fired is now her main business competitor. Ann's conniving general manager and fiancé, Donald Gregory (Warren Hull), convinces her to feign romantic interest in Gene and sweet talk him into selling his company to her. At first the plan appears to work, and Gene agrees to Ann's offer and signs a contract of sale. Later, when he learns that Gregory plans to close the plant putting all his employees out of work, Gene tears up the contract and decides to stay in the packing business.

Gene soon learns that his biggest business challenge is having enough cattle to fill the distribution demands. He initiates a campaign to convince the ranchers to sell their stock to his Belmont Packing Company, and soon the contracts start coming in. Ann responds with her own campaign, however, appealing to ranchers with a "helpless woman" routine. When he notices her success, Gene changes tactics and starts a new campaign, singing to the ranchers and organizing parades in an effort to win their business, and the campaign succeeds.

Unable to compete with legitimate business approaches, Gregory orders his men to use violence to stop the singing cowboy. Ann's little sister Patsy (Mary Lee), who has a crush on Gene, overhears Gregory's men plotting to dynamite the dam and flood the valley. After she warns Gene of Gregory's scheme, Gene rides off and intercepts Gregory's henchmen before they can plant their explosives. Soon after, Gregory is indicted for sabotage, and Gene and Ann form a business alliance as well as a romantic relationship.

Cast
 Gene Autry as Gene Autry
 Smiley Burnette as Frog Millhouse
 June Storey as Ann Randolph
 Mary Lee as Patsy Randolph
 Warren Hull as Donald Gregory
 Forbes Murray as Attorney Henry Walker
 Joe McGuinn as Henchman Martin
 Joe Frisco as Haberdasher
 Isabel Randolph as Miss Spencer
 Herbert Clifton as Butler Andrews
 Mildred Shay as Stewardess
 Si Jenks as Sheriff
 Cindy Walker as Singer with The Pacemakers
 The Pacemakers as Singers
 Slim Whitaker as Rancher (uncredited)
 Champion as Gene's Horse (uncredited)

Production

Filming and budget
Ride, Tenderfoot, Ride was filmed June 28 to July 12, 1940. The film had an operating budget of $74,965 (equal to $ today), and a negative cost of $74,443.

Stuntwork
 Joe Yrigoyen (Gene Autry's stunt double)
 Jack Kirk (Smiley Burnette's stunt double)
 Nellie Walker (June Storey's stunt double)

Filming locations
 Chatsworth Railroad Station, Chatsworth, Los Angeles, California, USA
 Corriganville Movie Ranch, Simi Valley, California, USA
 Agoura Ranch
 Lake Hemet, Riverside County, California, USA
 Palmdale, California, USA

Soundtrack
 "Ride, Tenderfoot, Ride" (Richard A. Whiting, Johnny Mercer) by Mary Lee
 "Ride, Tenderfoot, Ride" by Gene Autry, Mary Lee, and June Storey
 "When the Work's All Done This Fall" (D.J. O'Malley) by Gene Autry
 "Eleven More Months and Ten More Days" (Fred Hall, Arthur Fields) by Gene Autry and Smiley Burnette in jail
 "Woodpecker Song" (Eldo Di Lazzaro, Bruno Cherubini, Harold Adamson) by Gene Autry and Mary Lee
 "That Was Me by the Sea" (Smiley Burnette) by Smiley Burnette
 "Leanin' on the Ole Top Rail" (Charles Kenny, Nick Kenny) by Gene Autry
 "Oh! Oh! Oh!" (Gene Autry, Johnny Marvin) by Cindy Walker, Mary Lee with The Pacemakers and Others
 "On the Range" (Gene Autry, Johnny Marvin) by Gene Autry and Cowhands

References
Citations

Bibliography

External links
 
 
 

1940 films
1940 Western (genre) films
American Western (genre) films
American black-and-white films
Republic Pictures films
Films scored by Raoul Kraushaar
Films directed by Frank McDonald
1940s English-language films
1940s American films